Khalida Ghous or Khalida Ghaus (Urdu خالدہ غوث) is a Pakistani scholar of International Relations & Human Rights and an activist, who was awarded the First PhD in Human Rights from her country. Currently she is the managing director of Social Policy and Development Center, a Karachi based Pakistani research center of international repute.

Education
Khalida was educated at the University of Karachi, and holds MA & PhD degrees in International Relations. She did her PhD under the supervision of jurist Khalid M. Ishaq on the Institutionalization of Human Rights with the particular reference to the European Court of Human Rights.

Career 
Being one of the senior Professors, Dr. Ghous has completed her first term as Chairperson of the Department of International Relations, at the University of Karachi from September 2003 to September 2006 and is now on a long leave from the university. She has also remained the Director of the Centre of Excellence for Women's Studies at the University of Karachi.  
She also serves as the Honorary Director of the College of Liberal Arts and Social Sciences and the Honorary Director of the Pakistani Center for Democracy Studies Dr. Ghous has been teaching Human Rights & Foreign Policy Analysis for more than twenty years and has written extensively on the subjects. Having a book and monograph to her credit, she has also been involved in policy-making both with the Federal and Provincial Governments on gender-related issues. She is a member of several professional bodies and is a nominee of the Sindh Government in the monitoring committee constituted on Women Empowerment. 

She also teaches at the distinguished Institute of Business Administration (IBA), Karachi & gives lectures at renowned institutions in the country & abroad. Human Rights, the Far East and Pakistan's Foreign Policy are her areas of interest. 

In 2006, Khalida Ghous was one of the 18 prominent people who sent an open letter to President Pervez Musharraf, calling on him to resign either as president or as Chief of Army Staff.

Dr. Ghous has extensively published in internationally acclaimed journals, contributed articles in many books, and completed several research projects. She has participated in and organized many National & International Seminars & Conferences and delivered lectures at American Universities as a guest speaker and at various Staff Colleges at home. 

She has been a delegate to the United Nations Commission on Human Rights & was invited by European Union to deliver a talk in Brussels. Dr. Khalida is deeply involved in the Pakistan-India back-channel diplomacy being an active member of India-Pakistan Neemrana initiative. Many of her important suggestions were considered by Indo-Pak governments.

She is the author of a book on "Rights of Women in Islam", and co-editor of 'Pakistan's Foreign Policy: Problems and Prospects’.

Other notable positions include, but are not limited to:
 Managing director, Social Policy and Development Center, Karachi.
 Professor and ex-chairman, Department of International Relations, University of Karachi.
 Ex-Director, Center of Excellence for Women's Studies, University of Karachi.
 Ex-Editor, Journal of Humanities and Social Sciences, University of Karachi.
 Honorary Director, College of Liberal Arts and Social Sciences.
 Honorary Director, Pakistan Center for Democracy Studies.

Honors and fellowships
 Delegate in the General Assembly of World University Service in Lima, Peru, 1988.
 Ryoichi Sasakawa Young Fellowship, July 1992.
 Attended Salzburg Seminar on Transnational Law and Human Rights, 12–24 July 1992, Salzburg, Austria.
 Visited United States under the International Visitor's programme on Conflict Resolution Tensions in South Asia. 10 Oct – 8 November 1992.
 Represented Asia-Pacific Region in International World University Service Delegation at the 50th and 51st Session of United Nations Commission on Human Rights, 20–27 February 1994 and February 1995, Geneva.
 Asia Fellow at the Henry L. Stimson Center, Washington D.C. 1 June – 30 July 1999.

Books
Ghaus, Khalida, 2006 Trafficking of Women and Children in South Asia and Within Pakistan, New York: Lawyers for Human Rights and Legal Aid (LHRLA)
Ghaus, Khalida, 2002 Female homebased workers: the silent workforce, Karachi: Centre of Excellence for Women Studies, University of Karachi.
Ahmed, M. and Ghaus K., (ed.), 1999 Pakistan: Prospects and Perspectives, Karachi: Royal Book Company

References

Sources and external links
 Bio details, University of Karachi
 Social Policy and Development center
 Henry L. Stimson Center
 An interview with the Financial Post
 Important role in Indo-Pak track II diplomacy
 Voice of America takes her comments
 The Pioneer editorial
 President of Pakistan's website
 Dawn Pakistan's largest english daily praises Dr. Khalida in Editorial
 International Conference
  Activism

Academic staff of the University of Karachi
Pakistani feminists
University of Karachi alumni
Year of birth missing (living people)
Living people
Pakistani human rights activists